Richard Annang (born April 10, 1991, in Ghana) is a Ghanaian former footballer who played on the left wing, both as defender and as midfielder.

Career 
In 2009 and 2010, he joined TSG 1899 Hoffenheim and respectively AS Saint-Étienne on trial. Clubs like Arsenal F.C. and AFC Ajax have also expressed interest in Annang.

FC Vaslui 
In the summer of 2010 Annang signed a 5-year deal with Liga I side FC Vaslui.  After 6 games he was seen as a player with much potential and talent but he suffered a very bad injury (cruciate ligament rupture) that kept him away from the field for almost a year. After more than 2 seasons with Vaslui he left the club.

References

External links

People from Tema
Ghanaian footballers
Association football defenders
Living people
1991 births
Tema Youth players
FC Vaslui players
Berekum Chelsea F.C. players
Liga I players
Expatriate footballers in Romania
Ghanaian expatriate sportspeople in Romania
Ghanaian expatriate footballers